Michael James  (born Michael James Marchesano; February 1, 1962) is an American record producer, mixing engineer, guitarist, and former A&R executive. James has produced and/or mixed albums for New Radicals, Too Much Joy, Hole, L7, Maia Sharp, and A.J. Croce, among others.

Early life 

James was born to Elizabeth (née Powers) and Roy Marchesano and raised in Spain. James' father was first tenor in the famous Doo Wop group the Chaperones, which gave James his first exposure to music. As a young child, his parents divorced and James lived for three years (along with his mother) with the Diablo Motorcycle Club. At age eleven, James' family moved to California to get away from the Diablos, but soon thereafter James' mother became addicted to drugs, and the lack of parental support left him homeless several times during his adolescence. At age nineteen, James was signed to his first record deal with Ear Movie Records, a label owned by Ethan James, but his early career stalled when Michael turned down a major label deal to attend UCLA on a full scholarship. Still, James' first single, "She Said Yes," recorded for $15 in studio time, was released in 1983 as part of the first volume of the Radio Tokyo Tapes. In 1985 James formed the band Waves of Grain with Luke Lohnes from The Last. The group released the critically acclaimed album "The West Was Fun" before dissolving. After college, James turned his attention back to music, working as an engineer at Radio Tokyo Studios in the 1980s and becoming the studio's chief engineer by 1990.

Mainstream success 

James got his first big break producing Too Much Joy's second album "Son of Sam I Am," the first release on Irving Azoff's newly formed Giant Records. The following year, James produced and engineered L7's second album, "Smell the Magic", released on the Sub Pop label. This led to a relationship with Sub Pop, for whom James would later produce and engineer Hole's second single, "Dicknail" and The Reverend Horton Heat's "Speed Demon." James' successful early production work led to a brief side career as head of A&R for Warner Music Discovery.
 When Discovery was folded into Warner Music Group, James further diversified his musical endeavors, creating the independent record label Alternator Records. He also continued mixing and producing records, amassing more than 100 credits in the period between 1994 and 1997. In 1998, James engineered and mixed the RIAA platinum certified debut album by New Radicals, "Maybe You've Been Brainwashed Too", on which he also played electric guitar. James' involvement in the industry continued at a fast pace, including production and writing credits on A.J. Croce's 2000 album "Transit" and Maia Sharp's eponymous 2002 album.

Recent work 

In 2009, James founded IndieProMix with Rob Chiarelli, which offers mixing services with engineers including James as well as David Kahne (Paul McCartney, Stevie Nicks, The Strokes), Matt Forger (Michael Jackson), Tony Shepperd (Madonna, Whitney Houston, Take 6) and Nick Page (B.B. King, Fuel, Pete Yorn). James currently mixes and/or produces more than 250 songs a year, many for independent musicians, including Edwin McCain's "Mercy Bound," and Far's final album before disbanding, "At Night We Live", among others. Most recently the hit single 'Wild & Free' by Australian rock band Black Whiskey

Personal life 

James' most prominent hobby is bicycle racing, and in 2002, at the age of 40, he was a member of the Mercury Cycling team. James has also been featured as a guest writer for Billboard magazine, writing articles warning of potential changes due to a lack of innovation in A&R and the music industry long before digital downloads and file sharing caused a sharp decline in record sales in the 21st century. In 1991, he married Irina Irvine, a former actress turned microbial ecologist. He is an adherent of the Baháʼí Faith.

Selected Discography

 New Radicals – Maybe You've Been Brainwashed Too – Guitar, Mixing, Engineering 
 Edwin McCain – Mercy Bound – Mixing
 The Coronas – Dreaming Again (radio remix) – Mixing
 The Coronas – Upcoming LP Release (CD & Vinyl) – Mixing
 Maia Sharp – Change The Ending – Mixing
 Valentino Is Dead – Mis-Adventures in Punk Rock – Mixing
 Danielle LoPresti & Masses – Run With It – Writer, Guitar, Keyboards, Mixing,
 Saucy Monky – Trophy Girl, Part 1 – Mixing
 Far – At Night We Live – Mixing
 Far – Deafening – Mixing
 Far – If You Cared Enough – Mixing
 Far – When I Could See – Mixing
 Far – At Night We Live (7" remix) – Mixing
 Overbreaker – Follow The Rabbit Down The Hole – Writer, Mixing
 Butterfly Boucher – Another White Dash – Remix – Mixing, Keyboards
 Butterfly Boucher – Soulback – Remix – Mixing, Guitar
 A.J. Croce – Transit – Producer, engineer, Mixing, Guitar
 Robben Ford – Blue Moon – Remixing
 Robben Ford – Don't Deny Your Love: Remix – Mixing
 Robben Ford – Indianola – Mixing
 Maia Sharp – Maia Sharp – Mixing
 Maia Sharp – Willing To Burn -Single  – Remixing
 Too Much Joy – Son of Sam I Am – Producer, engineer, Guitar, Keyboards
 Too Much Joy – That's A Lie and Other Joy – Producer, engineer, Mixing, Keyboards
 Too Much Joy – Besides – Producer, engineer, Mixing
 Reverend Horton Heat – Speed Demon – Producer, engineer, Mixing
 Hole – Dicknail – Single – Producer, engineer
 Hole – Burn Black – Single – Producer, engineer
 Hole – My Body The Hand Grenade – Producer, engineer
 GPS – Window to the Soul – Mixing
 Geraldine Fibbers – Live From Bottom of The Hill – Mixing
 Chicago – Live From the Aerie Crown Theater, Remixing for DVD
 Chicago – CD USA: America’s Party December 31, 2006 Surround – Mixing
 Jane’s Addiction – The Gift (Movie) – Engineer 
 L7 – Smell The Magic – Producer, engineer, Mixing
 L7 – American Society – Producer, engineer, Mixing
 Jawbreaker – Busy – Single – Producer, engineer, Mixing
 Jawbreaker – Whack & Blite EP – Producer, engineer, Mixing
 Jawbreaker – Unfun – Producer, engineer, Mixing
 Jawbreaker – Etc. – Engineer
 Artificial Joy Club – Skywriting – Single – Remixing, producer, Guitar
 Artificial Joy Club – Spaceman – Single – Remixing, producer, Guitar
 Mike Finnegan, et al. – Organ-ized: An All – Star Tribute... – Mixing
 Robert Hicks & Pete Rugolo – Textures In Hi-Fi -Producer, Mixing, A&R, Guitar
 Robert Hicks – New Standards – Engineer, Mixing
 Rob Laufer – Wonderwood – Producer, Mixing, A&R, Guitar
 Sal's Birdland – Nude Photos Inside – Producer, Mixing, A&R
 The Crash Poets – Big Bang Theory – Producer, Engineer, Mixing, Guitar
 Danielle LoPresti & Masses – Outloud – Mixing, writer
 Danielle LoPresti & Masses – 22 Mountains – Mixing
 Danielle LoPresti – Dear Mr. Penis Head – Mixing, Executive Producer, writer, Guitar
 South of Houston (SoHo) – Live & Learn – Producer, Mixing, writer, Guitar
 Roy Ashen – Sugar and Gasoline – Producer, engineer, Mixing, writer, Keyboards
 Brian Charles – Sadder Day Dreaming – Producer, engineer
 Sylvia Juncosa – Nature – Engineer, Guitar
 The Maxfield Rabbit – Evermore – Producer, writer, Guitar
 Lisa Wong – Doin' My Thing – Engineer, Guitar
 The Mystery Band – Insert Title Here – Engineer
 Pitchfork – Eucalyptus / Saturn Outhouse – Producer, engineer
 Pitchfork – Saturn Outhouse EP – Producer, engineer
 Screaming Sirens – Voodoo – Engineer
 The Painkillers – Intoxication Of Life – Writer
 Zoo Story – Hey God – Mixing
 Sean Hall – Thirst – Mixing, engineer, Guitar
 The Invisible Man – The Invisible Man – Producer, engineer, Mixing, Guitar
 Trash Can School – Sick Jokes and Wet Dreams – Producer, engineer, Mixing, Keyboards
 Blend – Blend – Mixing
 Julia Albert – More Real Than This – Producer, Mixing, engineer, Guitar, Keyboards, writer
 Sean Hall – Oxygen – Producer, Mixing, engineer, Guitar Keyboards
 Karisa Winett – Pound 4 Pound – Producer, Mixing, engineer, Guitar, Keyboards, writer
 Brett Mikels – Deep Enough – Producer, Mixing
 Various Artists – The Big One: S.F. & L.A. – Producer, Engineer, Mixing
 Jabberwock – Southland – Producer, Mixing
 Jabberwock – Letterbomb – Producer, Mixing, Guitar
 Veneer – On That Note – Mixing
 Wishnefsky – Sin Tax – Mixing, Guitar
 Phunk Junkeez – What's The Time remix – Mixing
 Black Whiskey - Wild & Free - Producer, Mixing

References 

1962 births
American music industry executives
Record producers from New York (state)
Living people
People from Long Island
Guitarists from New York (state)
20th-century American guitarists